Events in the year 1999 in Greece.

Incumbents

Events 
 7 September – The 6.0  Athens earthquake shook the area with a maximum Mercalli intensity of IX (Violent), killing 22, injuring 800–1,600 injured, and causing $3–4.2 billion in damage.

References 

 
Years of the 20th century in Greece
Greece
1990s in Greece
Greece